Mommy's Little Girl: Casey Anthony and her Daughter Caylee's Tragic Fate is a 2009 biographical true crime book by novelist Diane Fanning about 2-year-old Caylee Anthony’s disappearance from her Florida home in July 2008. This  was the first book released about the case.

Casey Anthony, Caylee's mother, who was indicted for first-degree murder in the death, faced a capital murder charge in her trial. On the eve of jury selection, author Fanning appeared as a commentator on TruTV's "InSession." After the jury acquitted Anthony, Fanning told My San Antonio that she was "stunned" by the "not guilty" verdict.

Reviews
The Orlando Sentinel, in its 2009 book review, wrote that Fanning "tirelessly recounts the young woman's lying ways, theorizes how Anthony might have disposed of her daughter and concludes that Anthony is 'an individual whose self-absorption and insensitivity to others is a destructive force.'"

The producers of CBS's 48 Hours wrote in their review, "This timely account weaves together the details surrounding this highly publicized case. And WKMG-Channel 6 in Orlando gave it a thumbs up, saying the book "condenses those thousands and thousands of court documents into an easy-to-read story."

References

External links
 Mommy's Little Girl, St. Martin's Press
 Author's official website

Non-fiction crime books
2009 non-fiction books
American biographies
Non-fiction books about murders in the United States
Novels set in Orlando, Florida